The 2001 season was the Cleveland Browns' 53rd as a professional sports franchise, their 49th as a member of the National Football League, and the first season under head coach Butch Davis. The team improved on their 3-13 record from the previous season, but for the seventh straight year did not qualify for the postseason.

Offseason

2001 NFL Draft

Personnel

Roster

Bottlegate incident 

The most notable game from the 2001 Cleveland Browns season came on a December 16 game against the Jacksonville Jaguars in what became known as "Bottlegate". The Browns were driving toward the east end zone for what would have been the winning score. A controversial call on fourth down gave the Jaguars the ball. Browns' receiver Quincy Morgan had caught a pass for a first down on 4th and 2. After Tim Couch spiked the ball on the next play, referee Terry McAulay reviewed Morgan's catch, claiming that the replay officials had buzzed him before Couch spiked the ball. (NFL Rules state that once the next play is started, the officials cannot under any circumstances review any previous plays.) Upon reviewing the play, McAulay determined that Morgan never had control of the ball, thus the pass was incomplete, and the Jaguars were awarded the ball. Fans in the Dawg Pound began throwing plastic beer bottles and other objects on the field. McAulay declared the game over and sent the teams to the locker rooms. NFL Commissioner Paul Tagliabue then called to override the referee's decision, sending the players back onto the field, where the Jaguars ran out the last seconds under a hail of debris.

After the game, McAulay clarified that they first reviewed whether or not the electronic pager had buzzed before Couch had spiked the ball. In a discussion with the Replay Official, Bill Reynolds, it was determined that Reynolds buzzed down before the spike. After the game was called, Tagliabue called NFL Supervisor Dick McKenzie and informed him that the game had to be finished to completion. Neither McAulay nor Reynolds suggested to Tagliabue that the game should be called, which was within the power of the Commissioner's Office. Davis would later comment that he was told that the buzzer went off at the same time as the snap. Couch had initially believed that the officials were going to penalize the Browns for intentional grounding for Couch faking a spike before spiking it, but was then told that the spike was legal. The referees then began discussing the play prior to the spike. President and Chief Executive Officer Carmen Policy refused to criticize the actions of the fans and the decisions of the officiating crew.

Schedule 

Note: Intra-division opponents are in bold text.

Standings

Awards and records

Milestones 
2001 was the first of two seasons since the Browns were reactivated in 1999 in which the same quarterback (Tim Couch) started all 16 games. The second was (Baker Mayfield) in 2019.

Rookie Cornerback Anthony Henry had 10 interceptions including one ran back 97 yards for a touchdown.

References

External links 
 2001 Cleveland Browns at Pro Football Reference (Profootballreference.com)
 2001 Cleveland Browns Statistics at jt-sw.com
 2001 Cleveland Browns Schedule at jt-sw.com
 2001 Cleveland Browns at DatabaseFootball.com  

Cleveland
Cleveland Browns seasons
Cleveland